This is a list of people who are associated with what is now Ottawa, Ontario, Canada:

A

B

C

D

E

F

G

H

I

J

K

L

M

N

O

P

Q

R

S

T

V

W

Y

See also

 List of Canadians

References

 
Ottawa
People
Ottawa